The Seoul Marathon may refer to one of three races:

The Dong-A Ilbo Seoul International Marathon, established in 1931 and taking place every March
The JoongAng Seoul Marathon, established in 1999 and taking place every November
The Hi Seoul Marathon, an annual fun run for non-professionals